Mokhtar Kechamli (November 2, 1962 – July 5, 2019) was an Algerian football manager and player.

Career 
With the Algerian team, he played 10 games (for no goal scored) between 1985 and 1988. He is included in the group of 23 players at the CAN of 1986 and 1988.

Honours
ASM Oran
Algerian Cup: Runner-up 1980–81, 1982–83

MC Oran
Algerian Championship: 1991–92

References

1962 births
2019 deaths
1986 African Cup of Nations players
1988 African Cup of Nations players
Algeria international footballers
Algerian expatriate footballers
Algerian expatriate sportspeople in Saudi Arabia
Algerian footballers
RCG Oran players
ASM Oran players
Expatriate footballers in Morocco
Expatriate footballers in Saudi Arabia
Al-Wehda Club (Mecca) players
Saudi First Division League players
Hassania Agadir players
MC Oran players
Footballers from Oran
GC Mascara players
Algerian expatriate sportspeople in Morocco
Association football defenders
21st-century Algerian people